Locon is a commune in the Pas-de-Calais department in the Hauts-de-France region of France.

Geography
The river Lawe flows through the eastern part of the commune.

Population

Places of interest
 The church of St. Maur, rebuilt in 1955, using the original stained glass windows dating from the sixteenth century.

Twin towns
  Oesbern, in Germany

See also
Communes of the Pas-de-Calais department

References

External links

 Official website of Locon 

Communes of Pas-de-Calais